KDT may refer to:

 Euro container, stackable containers termed  (KLT)
 Knights of the Dinner Table, a comic book
 Kamphaeng Saen Airport  (IATA code: KDT), an airport serving Nakhon Pathom, in Thailand
 Keyword-driven testing, a software testing methodology
 KDT Nacional, an association football club from Callao, Peru
 Kilusang Diwa ng Taguig, a political party of the Philippines